NGC 3998 is a lenticular galaxy located in the constellation Ursa Major. It was discovered on April 14, 1789 by the astronomer William Herschel. At a distance of 45 million light-years (13.7 megaparsecs), it is located relatively nearby, making it a well-studied object.

In Gérard de Vaucouleurs' atlas of galaxy morphological types, NGC 3998 has a classification of SA00(r):, meaning it is unbarred and has an internal ring. It is classified as a LINER-type galaxy. As an early-type galaxy, NGC 3998's stars are relatively old and reddish in color, but its nuclear region may still have signs of star formation with stars less than 10 million years old. The galaxy's shape is very round, and also oblate.

Structure
NGC 3998 contains an active galactic nucleus, or AGN. These are supermassive black holes that are surrounded by accretion disks that emit large amounts of energy across the electromagnetic spectrum. The supermassive black hole has been modeled to be about  The AGN's power is relatively low, and like most other low-power radio galaxies, most of its emission is concentrated near its core. However, it also has some S-shaped lobes of emission, which are quite young and active, at only a few tens of millions of years old.

NGC 3998 has a small disk of ionized Hα radiation that is about 100 parsecs wide, along with a larger, warped disk of neutral hydrogen. It is thought that the gas disk has just started to align with the stellar distribution, which would also explain the warped shape of the radio emission.

References

External links 
 

Ursa Major (constellation)
3998
Unbarred lenticular galaxies
LINER galaxies
037642